The St. Joseph Catholic Church in Owensboro, Kentucky, United States was a historic church at 4th and Clay Streets which was built in 1878 and demolished in 1989.  It was added to the National Register of Historic Places in 1983.

It was deemed "significant as the best example of the Gothic Revival style of architecture in Owensboro and as the focal institution in the history of the German Roman Catholic community of Owensboro and Daviess County."

It was a front-gable brick structure with a bell tower and eight-sided spire.

The church was apparently demolished by 2013 when a photograph was taken of a memorial on the site.

References

Churches on the National Register of Historic Places in Kentucky
Gothic Revival church buildings in Kentucky
Roman Catholic churches completed in 1880
19th-century Roman Catholic church buildings in the United States
Churches in Owensboro, Kentucky
National Register of Historic Places in Daviess County, Kentucky
1880 establishments in Kentucky
Demolished buildings and structures in Kentucky
Demolished but still listed on the National Register of Historic Places